Tar Bone Kyaw is a senior Ta'ang (Palaung) military and political leader in Shan State, Myanmar (Burma). He is currently the secretary general of the Palaung State Liberation Front (PSLF), and the second-in-command of its armed wing, the Ta'ang National Liberation Army (TNLA).

Military career
Tar Bone Kyaw served in the Palaung State Liberation Organization/Army (PSLO/A) until they signed a ceasefire agreement with the government in 1991. After the PSLO/A disbanded, Tar Bone Kyaw, together with another Ta'ang leader, Tar Aik Bong, founded the TNLA alongside the PSLF to continue fighting for the self-determination of the Ta'ang people.

References

Burmese military personnel
Living people
Burmese rebels
Date of birth missing (living people)
Place of birth missing (living people)
Year of birth missing (living people)

Burmese warlords